Nowe Skalmierzyce railway station is a railway station in Nowe Skalmierzyce, Greater Poland Voivodeship, Poland, located in the Easten part of the city. The station is located on the  Łódź–Forst (Lausitz) railway. The train services are operated by Przewozy Regionalne.

Train services
The station is served by the following services:

 InterRegio services (IR) Ostrów Wielkopolski — Łódź — Warszawa Główna
 InterRegio services (IR) Poznań Główny — Ostrów Wielkopolski — Łódź — Warszawa Główna
 Regiona services (PR) Łódź Kaliska — Ostrów Wielkopolski 
 Regional services (PR) Łódź Kaliska — Ostrów Wielkopolski — Poznań Główny

References

Railway stations in Greater Poland Voivodeship
Railway stations served by Przewozy Regionalne InterRegio
Railway stations in Poland opened in 1896